Ytu brutus is a species of myxophagan beetle in the genus Ytu. It was described by Paul J. Spangler in  1980 and is endemic to Mato Grosso, Brazil.

References

Myxophaga
Beetles described in 1980
Endemic fauna of Brazil